Hema Sardesai, also known as Hemaa Sardesai, is an Indian playback singer and lyricist. Hema hails from the coastal state of Goa, in India, and was born in Mumbai. She shot to fame in 1997 with songs from movies like Sapnay, Biwi No. 1 and Jaanam Samjha Karo.

Early life

Hema Sardesai was born to Kumudini Sardesai (hailing from Parra) and Dr Kashinath Sardesai (hailing from Savoi-Verem, this doctor had previously been the cricket captain of Goa) and is the younger of their two daughters. Her talent was first discovered at the age of six by her school teacher, Late Mrs. Sequiera. She is an alumnus of Sharada Mandir School, and was born and brought up in Boca de Vaca, a locality of Panaji. She made her stage debut at the age of 8 years, at a Navratri Festival, where the local Gujarati Samaj encouraged her. She has accomplished the Sangeet Visharad in Indian classical music (with Pandit Sudhakar Karandikar as her first guru) and has always been passionate about Western Pop music.

Career
Sardesai has sung several songs for Bollywood films, and has released several Indipop albums. Sardesai is particularly known for singing "Aawara Bhawren Jo Hole Hole Gaaye" in the Hindi dubbed version of 1997 film Sapnay, which featured Kajol in the lead role. Some of her other famous songs include "Ishq Sona Hai" (Biwi No. 1), "Chali Chali Phir Chali" (Baghban) and "Badal Pe Paon Hai" (Chak De! India). She is the only Indian singer to win the Grand Prix at the International Pop Song Festival in Germany, has sung at the International UNICEF Concert in Europe and became the only female singer other than Lata Mangeshkar to perform at the celebrations for the 50th year of India's Independence day.

In 2011, she digitised her music on artistaloud.com.

In 2013, she wrote and sang three Konkani songs for the English film The Coffin Maker, starring Naseeruddin Shah. The film was based in a Goan village and was selected for the Indian Panorama section of IFFI 2013. It is about a coffin maker who learns about life in an unusual manner. The film went on to win the Best Feature Film Award at the River to River. Florence Indian Film Festival in 2013.

In 2017, she announced her debut in America, with her song "Power of Love", working with Mishal Raheja and Grammy Award winner Jared Lee Gosselin on the project.

Discography

Studio albums

Singles
 "Power of Love" (feat. Mishaal) (2017)

Soundtracks

Personal life

Family
Hema was married to Xavier D'Souza, who was an investment banker hailing from Cunchelim. He has previously been a hockey player for the Nehru Cup.Xavier D'Souza (Ex Don Bosco Goa, Ex Dempo College Goa, Ex Hockey Captain and Player Nehru cup) selflessly supported his wife Hema Sardesai in many a genuine activism for noble causes. Highly knowledgeable..A great husband, a great Son and a great friend to his friends. He was detected with Cancer last Nov 2019 and underwent a surgery. He again went through a major surgery in April 2020. He was nine weeks same year in Narayana Hospital Bangalore And in Sri Sri Hospital Bangalore for a month. Each time Doctors were amazed at his recovery. His wife Hema was by his bedside at his service every minute throughout. He had started responding well to the treatment. But the sudden onset of lymphoedema lead to some discomfort. And then a sudden cardiac arrest on 21st November 2020 took him in a second.

Community work
Sardesai is active in many social causes, such as:

 Save the girl child
 Women empowerment
 Anti-SEZ
 Goa Special Status
 Eco-friendly Ganesh idols
 Priority for locals for jobs in Goa

Reception
In 2017, Sardesai led a group of singers and artistes in a campaign against Sadhvi Saraswati, who had publicly requested the government to "hang those who consumed beef". In response to this, Sardesai launched a protest march in July 2016.

Also in 2017, Sardesai resigned from the position of the special icon for the 2017 Goa Legislative Assembly election, upon allegations of previously supporting ex-Chief Minister Manohar Parrikar by advocate and social activist Aires Rodrigues.

In 2019, she defended singer Anu Malik, who was facing allegations of sexual abuse and harassment, which led to her criticism by singer Shweta Pandit.

Awards and accolades
 1989 – 16th International Pop Song Festival, Grand Prix in Germany
 2006 – All India Woman's Conference, Gomant Tejaswini Award for her outstanding achievements in the music field. 
 2015 – On 9 Oct 2015, Hemaa was honoured with the Icon of the Year award at the 35th Brands Academy Awards evening.
 2015-In March 2015, Hemaa was also honoured with the Woman of the Year award, by Very. The event honours a leading lady of substance every year, for her unparalleled contribution to society across various fields.
 2015-In March 2015, Hemaa was selected for the Karmaveer Puraskaar award held in New Delhi for her able activity to many a social cause, above all for her silent contribution to the causes.
 2014-In August 2014, Hemaa was honoured with the PHD Excellence award in New Delhi.
 Hemaa was awarded the Hiramanek award titled International Women Achievers award, for her achievements.
 Hemaa is also the recipient of the International Achievers Award at the International Women's Conference of Art of Living.
 MTV Immies nominated Hemaa as 'Best Female Singer', for her song 'Qayamat' from the film Qayamat.

References

External links
 

 

20th-century Indian singers
Indian women playback singers
Bollywood playback singers
Indian folk-pop singers
Year of birth missing (living people)
Living people
Women musicians from Goa
Konkani-language singers
20th-century Indian women singers
21st-century Indian women singers
21st-century Indian singers
Singers from Goa